Orlando David Bareiro (born 13 April 1978) is a Paraguayan footballer who played for clubs in Chile and Argentina as well as in his native Peru.

References
 

1978 births
Living people
Sportspeople from Asunción
Paraguayan footballers
Association football forwards
Club Nacional footballers
Santiago Wanderers footballers
Chilean Primera División players
Expatriate footballers in Chile
Expatriate footballers in Argentina
Paraguayan expatriate footballers